Malik Muhammad Ehsan Ullah Tiwana  is a Pakistani politician who had been a member of the National Assembly of Pakistan from August 2018 till January 2023.

Political career
He was elected to the National Assembly of Pakistan from Constituency NA-94 (Khushab-II) as a candidate of Pakistan Tehreek-e-Insaf in 2018 Pakistani general election.
Muhammad Ehsan Ullah Tiwana is a Pakistani politician from Punjab District Khushab. He was born in the village Hassanpur Tiwana.His elder brother Malik Khuda Buksh Tiwana founded his own independent political group called the "Awami Group" in district Khushab and served as the provincial minister several times with his group having a strong role in local politics i.e providing as the platform for famous politicians including Malik Naeem Awan, Sumaira Malik and Malik Waris Kalu. His other elder brother Malik Ghulam Muhammad and younger brother Malik Saif Tiwana have each served as MNA and MPA. Malik Ehsan Tiwana studied at the Aitchison College. He then did his bachelor's degree in finance from University of South Florida. He entered politics for the first time in 1992 when he was elected twice as the chairman of District Council Khushab and then in 2001 till 2005, he served as the District Nazim of Khushab under the Musharraf tenure. He is hailed for being the man behind the inauguration and planning of Greater Thal Canal, bringing Sui Gas connections to a rural constituency for the first time in 2006 and reviving govt schools including the DPS among other major development projects in this term. In 2010, he joined the Pakistan Tehreek e Insaaf. Since 2010 he has been a loyal and committed party worker, making district Khushab a stronghold of PTI, prioritizing it over his family's personal vote bank and political group. He has served as a member of the PTI national and provincial executive committees in 2011 and 2015 respectively and in 2018 he led PTI's clean sweep in district Khushab by winning NA 94 alongside playing a huge role in PTI's success in NA 93, PP 82 and PP 83. In 2019, He was made the chairman for the Parliamentary standing committee on foreign affairs, member of PM's special committee on Agricultural products, Law and Justice sub committee convener for police reforms. 

 He represents the PTI govt and Pak's foreign policy on prime time TV channels as well as represents Pakistan's stance in conferences held in various countries. In 2019 December he led the National Assembly delegation to China and represented Pakistan delegation to Headquarters of the United Nations, Turkish Parliament and Chinese Parliament.He represents Pakistan's rural population and has been the voice for Pakistan's small scale farmers' rights in parliament.

References

External Link

More Reading
 List of members of the 15th National Assembly of Pakistan

Living people
Pakistani MNAs 2018–2023
Malik Muhammad Ehsan Ullah
1964 births